The Max Holste MH.52 was a 1940s French-built two-seat touring or training monoplane designed and constructed by Avions Max Holste.

Development and construction
Developed in the mid-1940s, the MH.52 was a low-wing cantilever monoplane with twin fins and rudders and a fixed tricycle landing gear. It had a cockpit with side-by-side seating for the pilot and trainee or passenger. The canopy was framed with forward-opening transparent sliding doors. The prototype first flew on 21 August 1945. The aircraft was powered by a variety of inline engines developing between 95 and 150 hp (71 to 112 kW).

A development of the MH.52 was the sole MH.53 Cadet which had a fixed tailwheel landing gear and a lower powered 135 hp (101 kW) de Havilland Gipsy Major 10 engine.

Operational history

A total of 13 production aircraft were built by the end of the 1940s. Most were flown by aero clubs and private pilots in France, but three examples were delivered to Egypt.

Survivors

Two MH.52s survived in the 2000s. No.4 is awaiting restoration to fly at an airfield near Paris.  No.11 is privately stored by a group located at an airfield near Bergerac.

Variants
Source: The Aircraft of the World.
MH.52M
MH.52G
MH.52R
MH.53
Tailwheel landing gear version of the MH.52G powered by a de Havilland Gipsy Major 10 engine. (1 built)

Specifications (MH.52)

See also

Notes

References

 The Illustrated Encyclopedia of Aircraft (Part Work 1982-1985), 1985, Orbis Publishing, Page 2435/6

1940s French civil utility aircraft
1940s French civil trainer aircraft
Max Holste aircraft
Single-engined tractor aircraft
Low-wing aircraft
Aircraft first flown in 1945
Twin-tail aircraft